Svend Nissen (born 31 May 1918) was an international speedway rider from Denmark.

Speedway career 
Nissen was a champion of Denmark, winning the Danish Championship in 1957.

References 

1918 births
Possibly living people
Danish speedway riders